Break Down is the debut Korean solo mini album of Kim Hyun-joong of South Korean boy band SS501. It was released on 7 June 2011 under KeyEast Entertainment. A Limited Edition was released on 23 June 2011, with a bonus DVD with music videos and behind-the-scene footages. The album was released in Taiwan by Warner Music Taiwan in two versions: Regular and Commemorate Editions.

Background
Kim's songs were produced by Steven Lee, who had composed SS501's hits "Love Like This" and "Love Ya". The title track "Break Down" is a high energy dance track featuring Double K. Another track, "Please" is a R&B heavy second lead track.

Promotions
For the album, Kim promoted the high tempo dance lead track "Break Down" featuring Double K, the R&B track "제발 (Please)" and the light tempo pop song "Kiss Kiss". He had also released music videos for these three songs.

Reception
The album exceeded 70,000 pre-ordered copies in 10 days. It peaked at number one on Gaon Weekly Album Chart for the week starting 5 June 2011 and was the best-selling album for June on Gaon Monthly Album Chart with 100,433 sales. It also topped the Oricon chart in Japan in the International Imported Album category for the first week of July.

The album's title track "Break Down" was the first-place winner for two consecutive weeks on Mnet's M! Countdown music show, for 16 and 23 June 2011; and also won for two consecutive weeks on KBS's Music Bank.

It is also certified platinum in Taiwan and Kim was presented with a platinum record by Warner Music Taiwan CEO Chen Ze Shan in a press conference held in Taiwan.

Track listing

Release history

Charts

References

External links
  Kim Hyun Joong discography

2011 debut EPs
SS501 albums
Warner Music Taiwan EPs